Brayton Grist Mill is an historic grist mill along Mashamoquet Brook, at the entrance to Mashamoquet Brook State Park off United States Route 44 in Pomfret, Connecticut.  Built about 1890, it is one of the best-preserved 19th-century rural grist mills in the state.  It was listed on the National Register of Historic Places in 1986.  The mill has been restored, and is maintained by the Pomfret Historical Society as the Marcy Blacksmith Museum; it is open by appointment.

Description and history
The Brayton Grist Mill is located near the geographic center of Pomfret, on the west side of the entrance road to Mashamoquet Brook State Park, just south of US 44.  It is a vernacular post-and-beam frame structure, four stories in height, with a gabled roof and clapboarded exterior.  Mashamoquet Brook parallels the road, descending in a southerly direction, and passes west of the building.  The mill was probably fed by a headrace or underground channel.  Its power equipment includes a 19th-century turbine mounted in a wooden frame in the basement, reinforced with cast iron tie rods.  The second level of the mill houses equipment for gearing the turbine's power shaft down to equipment working speed.  The third level houses milling equipment patented in 1888 and 1890.  It now also houses a collection of blacksmithing tools and equipment.

Mashamoquet Brook was the site of a number of early mills, dating at least as far back as 1816.  This mill was built by William Brayton c. 1890 from materials salvaged from older mills that were on the site.  It is the last surviving mill of several that are known to have lined Mashamoquet Brook in the area.  Brayton died in 1928, and the state purchased the property in 1930 as part of an enlargement of the state park.

See also
National Register of Historic Places listings in Windham County, Connecticut

References

Industrial buildings completed in 1890
Grinding mills on the National Register of Historic Places in Connecticut
Grinding mills in Connecticut
Buildings and structures in Windham County, Connecticut
Museums in Windham County, Connecticut
Mill museums in the United States
Pomfret, Connecticut
National Register of Historic Places in Windham County, Connecticut
1890 establishments in Connecticut